Paralongidorus is a genus of  nematodes.

References 

Enoplea genera
Longidoridae